The state-by-state results in the Australian House of Representatives at the 2019 federal election were: Coalition 77, Labor 68, Australian Greens 1, Centre Alliance 1, Katter's Australian Party 1, and Independents 3.

Australia

States

New South Wales

Victoria

Queensland

Western Australia

South Australia

Tasmania

Territories

Australian Capital Territory

Northern Territory

Two party preferred preference flow

Notes

References

External links 
 Australian Electoral Commission: 2019 Tally Room
 ABC Elections: 2019 Federal Election Results
 How did we vote? - A detailed breakdown of Australia's election

2019 Australian federal election
House of Representatives 2019